Two-time defending champions Alfie Hewett and Gordon Reid defeated Gustavo Fernández and Shingo Kunieda in the final, 1–6, 6–4, [11–9] to win the men's doubles wheelchair tennis title at the 2019 US Open.

Seeds

Draw

Bracket

External links 

 Draw

Wheelchair Men's Doubles
U.S. Open, 2019 Men's Doubles